In 2000, New York residents John Langan and Neil Conrad Spicehandler traveled to Vermont, where they affirmed their commitment under Vermont's Civil Union laws. They were planning to adopt a child, and had purchased a house in Massapequa. Just hours after the closing of their house, Spicehandler was struck by an automobile in Manhattan. Spicehandler subsequently died following treatment at Saint Vincent's Catholic Medical Center. Survivor Langan brought a malpractice suit against the Hospital, arguing standing as a "spouse" for purposes of New York's wrongful death statute.

Lower court ruling

In 2003, the New York Supreme Court (the state's trial court) held that Langan had standing as a "spouse" for the purposes of New York's wrongful death statute.  New York courts, under principles of full faith and credit and comity recognize valid contracts established under the laws of her sister states so long as they do not offend a New York state policy.  This policy is especially true of marriages celebrated in other states. Spouses in out-of-state marriages would thus be extended the privileges and immunities the marriage laws of New York extend to marriages officiated in-state. Even common law marriages, which are not recognized for in-state New York cohabiting partners, are recognized for purposes of New York spousal benefits so long as the common law marriage was validly entered into in another state.

The court ruled that partners in a civil union, a relationship status wholly legal in Vermont, are therefore indistinguishable from spouses in marriage to the extent of the rights conferred to a "spouse" under New York's wrongful death statute.

Intermediate court ruling

On October 11, 2005, the New York Supreme Court, Appellate Division (intermediate appellate level court) overturned the lower court ruling. The appellate court concluded that the state legislature did not contemplate protecting same-sex couples when it enacted the wrongful death statute and that Langan had failed to demonstrate that there was no legitimate purpose for the statute's exclusion of same-sex couples. Langan v. St. Vincent’s Hospital, 802 N.Y.S.2d 476 (N.Y. App. Div. 2005).

Highest court ruling

The New York Court of Appeals, the state's highest court, affirmed in 2006 the intermediate court's decision to deny Langan standing as surviving "spouse", thus blocking Langan from bringing suit against St. Vincent's Hospital. Langan v. St. Vincent's Hospital, 25 A.D.3d 90, 802 N.Y.S.2d 476 (N.Y. App. Div. 2005), review denied, 850 N.E.2d 672 (N.Y. 2006).

United States same-sex union case law
New York Supreme Court cases
2005 in United States case law
2005 in New York (state)
2005 in LGBT history